Delayed Action is a 1954 British film noir mystery film directed by John Harlow and starring Robert Ayres, June Thorburn and Alan Wheatley. It was produced as a second feature for release by General Film Distributors. It was shot at Twickenham Studios in London with sets designed by the art director Wilfred Arnold.

Plot
Two criminals do a deal with a suicidal man, who will confess to crimes they have committed before killing himself. However he subsequently has a change of heart.

Cast
 Robert Ayres as Ned Ellison
 June Thorburn as Anne Curlew
 Alan Wheatley as Mark Cruden
 Bruce Seton as Sellars
 Michael Balfour as Honey
 Michael Kelly as Lobb
 John Horsley as Worsley
 Olive Kirby as Angela Bentley
 Ballard Berkeley as Insp. Crane
 Ian Fleming as Dr. Jepson
 Myrtle Reed as Jackie
 Dennis Chinnery as  Bank cashier
 Charles Lamb as Bank clerk
 Arthur Hewlett as Battersby (uncredited)
 Frederick Leister as Sir Francis Henry (uncredited)

Critical reception
TV Guide wrote, "robbers pay suicidal writer Ayres to confess to their crime and kill himself should their scheme fail. An interesting premise in an otherwise dull movie."
Radio Times noted, "the prolific B-team of Monty Berman and Robert S Baker were the brains behind this moody little thriller. There's a hint here of the ingenuity that would lead to their TV success with such series as The Saint and Randall and Hopkirk (Deceased)."

References

External links

1954 films
British mystery films
Films directed by John Harlow
1950s mystery films
Films shot at Twickenham Film Studios
1950s English-language films
British black-and-white films
1950s British films